Kenneth John Atchity (born 1944) is an American producer, author and columnist, book reviewer, brand consultant, and professor of comparative literature.

Personal
Kenneth Atchity was born on January 16, 1944, in Eunice, Louisiana, son of Fred J. and Myrza (née Aguillard) Atchity. He grew up between Louisiana and Kansas City, Missouri. He  resides in Los Angeles, California, and New York City.

Atchity is married to documentary filmmaker and former NHK producer Kayoko Mitsumatsu, also founder of the non-profit organization Yoga Gives Back for which Atchity is on the board of directors.

Atchity has two children, Rosemary and Vincent. His son, Vincent Atchity, graduated from Georgetown College (Ph.D., USC) and his daughter, Rosemary Atchity, from Columbia University, (RN, MSN, FNP-c; Contra Costa College ). Both have two children.

Academic career 
After receiving a Jesuit education from Rockhurst High School and Georgetown University, where he was a member of the Philodemic Society and received an Ignatian Scholarship to study Greek and Latin classics, Atchity received a Woodrow Wilson Fellowship to Yale and received his MPhil in Theatre History and his Ph.D. Comparative Literature from Yale. His dissertation, Homer's Iliad: The Shield of Memory, was awarded the John Addison Porter Prize. Kenneth went on to become a professor of literature and classics at Occidental College where he served as the chairman of the comparative literature department, distinguished instructor at UCLA's Writers Program, and as Fulbright Professor of American studies to the University of Bologna. During his teaching career he was a frequent columnist for The Los Angeles Times Book Review. With Marsha Kinder, he founded and edited Dreamworks. An Inter-disciplinary Quarterly. Its advisory board included John Cage, William Dement, Ann Faraday, John Fowles, J. Allan Hobson, John Hollander, Ursula Le Guin, W.S. Merwin, Denise Levertov and Robert L. Van de Castle. Atchity resigned his tenured professorship at Occidental in 1987 to devote full-time to entertainment and publishing.

His articles on English and American literature have appeared in the following publications: American Quarterly, Comparative Literature Studies, Kenyon Review, Philological Quarterly; on Italian literature in Italian Quarterly, Spicilegio Moderno, and Italica'; and classical literature in Arethusa, Classical Philology. His scholarly reviews were published in Ball State University Forum, Kansas Quarterly, Mediterranean Review, Queen’s Quarterly, Thought, University of Portland Review, and Western Humanities Review. In addition to the Los Angeles Times Book Review, reviews have appeared in Contemporary Literary Criticism, Folio, The Huffington Post, New Haven Register, Orpheus, Poem, Poetry LA, San Francisco Chronicle, St. Louis Post-Dispatch, and The Washington Post.

Entertainment career
In 1976 Atchity founded L/A House, Inc., a consulting, translation, book, television, film development, and production company whose clients included the Getty Museum and the US Postal Service. L/A House began by extending Atchity's teaching of creative writing to manuscript consultation and soon moved on to publishing with the production of Follies, a magazine covering creativity, and CQ: Contemporary Quarterly; Poetry and Art of which he was editor. In the 1980s L/A House moved into television, with a syndicated television pilot of BreakThrough! of which Atchity was executive producer and co-writer.

In 1985, L/A House began development of a set of video/TV romance film projects entitled Shades of Love, which became 16 full-length films, produced in 1986–87 with Atchity as executive producer, that aired throughout the world, distributed by Lorimar, Astral-Bellevue-Pathe, Manson International, and Warner Brothers International, nominated for Canada's Gemini Award; in the U.S. they premiered on Cinemax-HBO.

In 1989 he sold L/A House and founded AEI (Atchity Editorial/Entertainment International), a literary management and motion picture production company. Atchity sold Steve Alten’s Meg to Bantam-Doubleday at auction in a $2.2M deal; and then to Disney, partnered with Zide-Perry, for $1.2 (later, to Newline Pictures for a similar price). Incorporated in 1996, its name was changed to Atchity Entertainment International, Inc. in 2005.

In 1996 Atchity also founded The Writer's Lifeline (incorporated in 2002). 

In 2006, he and manager-partner Fred Griffin of Houston's Griffin Partners along with a group of investors from Louisiana and Texas, acquired The Louisiana Wave Studio, LLC in Shreveport, Louisiana from Walt Disney Productions. The LWS is the only tank specifically designed to make waves for motion pictures in North America. Films produced at the LWS include The Guardian, Mayday—Bering Sea, Shark Night 3D, Streets of Blood, and I Love You, Philip Morris; along with numerous government and industrial films.

In 2011 Atchity was nominated for an Emmy for producing The Kennedy Detail (Discovery) based on their clients' Jerry Blaine and Lisa McCubbin's New York Times bestselling book by the same title published by Gallery/Simon & Schuster in 2010. AEI's films include Joe Somebody (Tim Allen, Julie Bowen), Life Or Something Like It (Angelina Jolie, Edward Burns), and The MEG (Jason Statham).

In 2010, Atchity also founded Atchity Productions and Story Merchant.

The Messiah Matrix 
In 2012, Atchity published his completion of William Diehl's Seven Ways to Die and his first solo novel, The Messiah Matrix. The novel centers on a fictional marine archaeological find of a rare Herodian coin honoring Augustus. A romantic interest develops between the American archaeologist who has discovered the coin, and a young Jesuit priest intrigued by its implications.  A powerful faction of the Jesuits has been preparing to announce that the fictional character Jesus of Nazareth was inspired by the life of Caesar Augustus, and the coin is crucial evidence for their claim. Regarding the premise of his novel, Atchity said that it is based on actual historical facts linking Jesus and Augustus.

Producing filmography

The Meg  (Jason Statham) (2018) (Warner Brothers)
Angels in the Snow (Kristy Swanson) (2015) (UpTV "Most watched" movie). 
14 Days with Alzheimer's (Documentary Short) (film festivals)
Erased   (Aaron Eckhart) (2012) (Informant Media Entertainment)
Hysteria (Maggie Gyllenhaal, Rupert Everett) (2011) (Informant Media Entertainment)
The Lost Valentine (Betty White, Jennifer Love Hewitt) (2011) (Hallmark Hall of Fame/CBS)
The Kennedy Detail (narrated by Martin Sheen) (2010) (Sunday Night Special) (Discovery)
Gospel Hill (Danny Glover, Angela Bassett) (2008) (Fox)
The Madam's Family (Ellen Burstyn, Annabella Sciorra) (2004) (CBS)
Life or Something Like It (Angelina Jolie, Edward Burns) (2002) (Fox)
Joe Somebody (Tim Allen) (2001) (Fox)
Stalker: Shadow of Obsession (Veronica Hamel, Jonathan Banks) (1994) (NBC)
Falling Over Backwards  (Saul Rubinek) (1990) (Astral)
Amityville 4: The Evil Escapes (Patty Duke) (1989) (NBC)
Shades of Love Romance TV movie series (1987–1988) (Cinemax/HBO), Genie Award

Books by Atchity
Sell Your Story to Hollywood: Writers Guide to the Business of Show Business (Story Merchant Books) (2017); 
The Meander Tile of Lisa Greco (Romance of Mythic Identity Book 2) (as Andrea Aguillard) (Story Merchant Books) (2017)  
The Twaesum Aik of Brae MacKenzie (A Romance of Mythic Identity Book 1) (as Andrea Aguillard) (Story Merchant Books) (2016) 
The Messiah Matrix (Imprimatur Britannica/Story Merchant Books) (2012); 
How to Quit Your Day Job and Live Out Your Dreams (Skyhorse Publishing) (2012); 
Seven Ways to Die (with William Diehl) (AEI/Story Merchant Books) (2012); 
How to Publish Your Novel (SquareOne) (2005);
How to Escape Lifetime Security and Pursue Your Impossible Dream: A Guide to Transforming Your Career (Helios) (2004); revision of The Mercury Transition, below.
Writing Treatments That Sell: How to Create and Market Your Story Ideas to the Motion Picture and TV Industry (with Chi-Li Wong) (Holt/Owl Books; Quality Paperbacks, Writers Digest Book Club) (Second Edition, 2003);
The Classical Roman Reader (Holt 1997); (Oxford University Press 1998);Independent Publisher Book Awards, 2017
The Classical Greek Reader (Holt, 1996); (Oxford University Press, 1998);
The Renaissance Reader (HarperCollins, 1996); (Harper paperback, 1997). 
Cajun Household Wisdom (Longmeadow Press, 1995). 
The Mercury Transition: How to Escape Lifetime Security to Live Your Impossible Dream (Longmeadow Press, 1994).
(editor) Homer: Critical Essays, including essays "Greek Princes and Aegean Princesses: The Role of Women in the Homeric Poems" (with E.J.W. Barber) and "Andromache's Headdress" (G. K. Hall) (1987);
A Writer's Time: A Guide to the Creative Process, from Vision through Revision (W.W. Norton) (1986) (Quality Paperbacks, Book of the Month Club, Writer's Digest Book Club) (David & Charles paperback, United Kingdom, as Writing: Make the Most of Your Time New revised and expanded edition, A Writer's Time: Making Time to Write (1995) Christopher Lehmann-Haupt, in The New York Times review, called AWT "the best recent book on writing"; 
Sleeping with an Elephant: Selected Poems, 1965–1976 (Valkyrie Press)(1978);
Homer's Iliad: The Shield of Memory Introduction by John Gardner (Southern Illinois University Press) (1978);
(co-editor and contributor) Italian Literature: Roots & Branches including his essay, "Dante's Purgatorio: The Poem Reveals Itself" (Yale University Press) (1976);
 In Praise of Love Libretto for choral symphony premiered at Lincoln Center (1974).
(editor) Eterne in Mutabilitie: The Unity of the Faerie Queene (Archon) (1972).

References

Memberships 
American Comparative Literature Association
The Academy of Television Arts & Sciences
The Producers Guild of America
Academy of American Poets

External links

Living people
1944 births
American consultants
American editors
American film producers
American male writers
Branding consultants
Screenwriting instructors
Writers of books about writing fiction
Philodemic Society members
21st-century American writers
21st-century American businesspeople